San Pedro de los Altos is a town in the state of Miranda, Venezuela.

San Pedro de los Altos is on the banks of the San Pedro River. It was made by Spanish colonists as colonial era town on the road connecting Caracas and the west.

Populated places in Miranda (state)